Prison break may refer to:

Prison break, alternative term for jailbreak or prison escape
Prison Break (film), 1938 American crime drama
Prison Break, 2005 American TV serial drama
Prison Break: The Final Break, 2009 American TV film, part of Prison Break TV franchise
Prison Break (Amphibia), July 2, 2019 episode of American animated TV series

See also
Jailbreak (disambiguation)